World Peace Hope et al. is a compilation by The Dead C, released in 1994 through Shock Records.

Track listing

Personnel 
The Dead C
Michael Morley – instruments
Bruce Russell – instruments
Robbie Yeats – instruments
Production and additional personnel
Denis Blackham – mastering
The Dead C – production
Alastair Galbraith – violin on "Abschied"
John Harvey – sampler on "Helen"
Peter Jefferies – engineering on "Sun Stabbed" and "Fire"
Stephen Kilroy – mastering
Graham Lambkin – illustrations

References 

1994 compilation albums
The Dead C albums
Shock Records compilation albums